Adrian Jaoude (born October 11, 1981) is a  Brazilian professional wrestler, Jiu-Jitsu practitioner, and former amateur wrestler. He is best known for his time in WWE, where he performed under the ring name Arturo Ruas. Previously, he has also wrestled for Evolve. Prior to entering pro wrestling he was an amateur wrestler and represented his country at the 2011 Pan American Games in Guadalajara, Mexico.

Amateur wrestling and combat sports career
Jaoude participated in the men's 84 kg division in amateur wrestling at the 2011 Pan American Games, finishing 4th. For 17 years he was an unbeaten freestyle wrestling champion Brazil. As well as Jiu-Jitsu, he is also well-versed in capoeira.

Professional wrestling career

WWE (2015–2021) 
Jaoude signed with WWE in 2015. He was trained at the WWE Performance Center and made his debut in July 2016 during a house show, in which he teamed with Niko Bogojevic (Otis) against Gzim Selmani (Rezar) and Sunny Dhinsa (Akam). On the July 18, 2018 episode of NXT, Jaoude made his NXT debut where he was defeated by Kassius Ohno (Chris Hero). On the June 13, 2019 episode of NXT, Jaoude, now under the ring name of Arturo Ruas, was defeated by Matt Riddle. 

On the August 10, 2020 episode of Raw, Ruas made his Raw debut in a Raw Underground segment, an underground fight club hosted by Shane McMahon, where he defeated Mikey Spandex by knockout. As part of the 2020 Draft in October, Ruas was drafted to the Raw brand, though he was then quickly and quietly moved back to NXT. On June 25, 2021, Jaoude was released from his WWE contract.

AEW (2021) 
On 26 October 2021, Jaoude made his in-ring debut during an episode of AEW Dark, under the name Tiger Ruas.

Championships and accomplishments
 Pro Wrestling Illustrated
 Ranked No. 483 of the top 500 singles wrestlers in the PWI 500 in 2019

References

External links 
 
 
 

1981 births
Living people
Sportspeople from Beirut
People with acquired Brazilian citizenship
Sportspeople from Rio de Janeiro (state)
Brazilian male professional wrestlers
Brazilian male sport wrestlers
Pan American Games competitors for Brazil
Wrestlers at the 2011 Pan American Games
Brazilian people of Lebanese descent
Sportspeople of Lebanese descent
21st-century professional wrestlers